The Rosalind Franklin Institute is medical research centre supported by the Government of the United Kingdom located at the Harwell Science and Innovation Campus, Oxfordshire, England. It is named after an English chemist Rosalind Franklin, whose discoveries provided the key data for the correct explanation of the helical structure of DNA in 1953. Launched on 6 June 2018, it was officially opened on 29 September 2021.

The government approval was announced on 23 February 2017 by Greg Clark, Secretary of State for Business, Energy and Industrial Strategy. According to the press release the basis of the name was "in honour of the pioneering British scientist [Rosalind Franklin] whose use of X-rays to study biological structures played a crucial role in the discovery of DNA's 'double helix' structure by Francis Crick and James Watson". The objective was "to develop disruptive new technologies designed to tackle major challenges in health and life sciences, accelerate the discovery of new treatments for chronic diseases affecting millions of people around the world (such as dementia), and deliver new jobs and long-term growth to the local and UK economies."

The proposal of the institute was led by Ian Walmsley, Pro-Vice Chancellor at the University of Oxford, and the project was initiated under the lead of Andrew Livingston, Professor of Chemical Engineering at Imperial College London and James H Naismith, Professor of Structural Biology at Oxford University. Originally funded with £103 million by the Engineering and Physical Sciences Research Council through the Science and Technology Facilities Council (STFC) of the United Kingdom Research and Innovation, research collaboration will be shared by ten universities including University of Birmingham, University of Cambridge, University of Edinburgh, Imperial, King's College London, University of Leeds, Manchester, University of Oxford, University of Southampton, and University College London. In July 2018, Vivienne Cox was appointed the first Chair, and in June 2019, Jim Naismith became the first Director.

One of the first projects was development of ultra-fast video camera, which could be used detect and treat complex diseases such as cancer. It would be the first camera in the world that can capture up to 100 million individual frames per second at a resolution of 1 megapixel. The main hub is at Harwell Science and Innovation Campus. The building will be 58,000 sq ft with a budget of £40 million. Construction started on 20 May 2019 and is projected for completion in 2020. It is located adjacent to the Diamond Light Source as this facility planned for housing the largest microscopy centre in the world.

Building and facilities
The Rosalind Franklin Institute is located in the Harwell Science and Innovation Campus which is also home to the Diamond Light Source synchrotron, Isis Neutron Spallation source, and the Central Laser Facility. 
The building was opened by Professor Lynn Gladden, Chief Executive of the Engineering and Physical Sciences Research Council, which funds the Franklin, and delegates from industry and academia, including Nobel Prize winner Richard Henderson. The £43m building, constructed by UKRI-STFC working with Mace and project managed by AECOM The IBI group were awarded the "Excellence in Architectural Technology, Medium-Mega
2021" for their work on the building.

References

External links
Profile at the Engineering and Physical Sciences Research Council
Info at Cambridge University

Research institutes in Oxfordshire
Buildings and structures in Oxfordshire
Medical research institutes in the United Kingdom